Bryan Cave Leighton Paisner LLP is an international law firm with 25 offices worldwide.   Bryan Cave was headquartered in St Louis, Missouri. Berwin Leighton Paisner was headquartered in London. 

In 2018, Bryan Cave and Berwin Leighton Paisner merged to create Bryan Cave Leighton Paisner LLP. The new firm is led by co-chairs Lisa Mayhew and Steve Baumer.

History
King, Phillips & Stewart was founded in 1873 in St. Louis, Mo. A merger resulted in Stewart, Bryan, Christie & Williams in 1911. After six years, P. Taylor Bryan's name became the first in the firm title, where it remains to this day. Rhodes Cave joined the firm in 1917, and it was then named Bryan, Williams & Cave.

In 1932, UK-based firm Paisner & Co, provided general legal advice, including conveyancing. Almost a decade later, the firm developed a reputation for corporate work. Its clients included Great Universal Stores, Forte Holdings, and Penguin Books. In 1939 the firm took over an American company called McDonnell Aircraft Company, now The Boeing Company. Leighton & Co in 1947 provided litigation and property advice to property developers in the West End of London. Berwin Leighton was formed from a merger of Leighton & Co and Berwin & Co. Their clients included Tesco, British Land, Ove Arup, and Lex. Bryan Cave became a strong regional law firm with 52 lawyers in St. Louis in 1973.

Growth and expansion 
The firm's first office opened in 1978 in Washington, D.C., and later in Los Angeles and New York. A decade later, they expanded to the west and southwest and opened offices in Phoenix and Kansas City. 

After a period of two years, Berwin Leighton Paisner was formed. The firm has more than 900 staff, including 122 partners. The firm became a top 15 City practice in London with 122 partners, 430 fee earners, and a turnover of £88m. The merger enhanced the firm's profile as a leader in the U.K. property market. In the U.S., the Chicago office opens. Shortly after, Bryan Cave and New York-based Robinson Silverman Pearce Aronsohn & Berman merged, substantially enhancing the firm's presence in New York.  

After a few years, Bryan Cave opened offices in San Francisco and Paris. In 2009, Berwin Leighton Paisner was joined by a team of 70 lawyers in Moscow under the leadership of Andrey Goltsblat to form a full-service, multi-award-winning office under the name Goltsblat BLP. Bryan Cave and Atlanta-based Powell Goldstein merge, creating new offices in Atlanta, Charlotte, and Dallas.    

In 2005 Bryan Cave lost its Riyadh and Dubai offices to the Houston-based mega-firm Fulbright & Jaworski, but retained its office in Kuwait. The Kuwait office however soon closed as well.

In 2007 offices were opened in Hamburg and Milan, followed by San Francisco and Paris in 2008.

In 2009, Bryan Cave and Atlanta-based Powell Goldstein merged, creating an expanded firm with new offices in Atlanta, Charlotte, and Dallas.

At the beginning of 2012, Bryan Cave merged with Holme Roberts & Owen (HRO), a law firm based in Denver, Colorado with over 210 attorneys.

Bryan Cave also established an office in Frankfurt, Germany in 2012, to be integrated with the firm's already established Hamburg office.

In 2018, Bryan Cave merged with the London firm of Berwin Leighton Paisner.

Notable transactions 
Represented Ralcorp in the $2.6 billion merger between Ralcorp and Kraft Foods' portfolio of cereals under the Post Cereal label.
Advised Monsanto in its $290 million purchase of Aly Participacoes, a division of Brazilian global conglomerate Votorantim. Aly Participacoes operated two companies, CanaVialis S.A. and Alellyx S.A. which focus on sugarcane breeding and related applied genomics and biotech in the sugarcane industry.
Counseled Barnes & Noble, the bookseller, on its $596 million purchase of Barnes & Noble College Booksellers Inc., a division that had been spun off from Barnes & Noble in the mid-1980s. The acquisition closed on October 1, 2009.

References

External links 

Law firms established in 1873
Law firms based in St. Louis
Foreign law firms with offices in Hong Kong
1873 establishments in Missouri